Coconut Creek High School is a high school located in Coconut Creek, Florida, which teaches grades 9–12. Coconut Creek High serves: southern Coconut Creek, and parts of Margate, North Lauderdale, and Pompano Beach. The school is a part of the Broward County School District. It opened in 1970.

Demographics
As of the 2021-22 school year, the total enrollment was 1,916. The ethnic makeup was 74% Black, 21.4% White, 18.5% Hispanic, 2% Multiracial, 1.6% Asian, 0.4% Pacific Islander, and 0.6% Native American or Native Alaskan.

Notable alumni
 Beth Bloom, United States District Court Judge for the Southern District of Florida
 Bobby Cannavale, actor (expelled senior year, did not graduate from CCHS)
 Brad Eldred, MLB player (Pittsburgh Pirates, Colorado Rockies, Detroit Tigers)
 Mat Latos, MLB player (San Diego Padres, Cincinnati Reds)
 Joe Lo Truglio, actor
 Hamin Milligan, Arena Football League player
 Hanik Milligan, National Football League player
Trayvon Mullen, Cornerback for the Las Vegas Raiders of the National Football League. 2x CFP National Champion with the Clemson Tigers
Ryan Parmeter, professional wrestler known as Konnor (The Ascension) with World Wrestling Entertainment
 Joseline Hernandez, television personality 
 Dave Thomas, founder of Wendy's
Binjimen Victor, Wide Receiver for the Baltimore Ravens of the National Football League.

References

External links 
Official Site

Broward County Public Schools
High schools in Broward County, Florida
Public high schools in Florida
Coconut Creek, Florida
Educational institutions established in 1970
1970 establishments in Florida